The Fall of New Amsterdam is a historical painting by the American artist Jean Leon Gerome Ferris.

References

External links
American Gallery

American paintings
1932 paintings